Herpetosiphonales is an order of bacteria in the class Chloroflexia.

See also
 List of bacterial orders

References

External links

Phototrophic bacteria
Chloroflexota